Luxiaria mitorrhaphes is a moth in the family Geometridae first described by Louis Beethoven Prout in 1925. It is found from the Himalayas to Japan, Taiwan, Myanmar, Borneo and Java.

References

Moths described in 1925
Ennominae
Moths of Japan